Iridomyrmex pallidus is a species of ant in the genus Iridomyrmex. Described by Forel in 1901, the ant is endemic to Australia, New Guinea and the Solomon Islands, and their preferred habitats include tropical rainforests and eucalypt forest.

References

Iridomyrmex
Hymenoptera of Australia
Insects of New Guinea
Insects described in 2011